The Heidrun oil field is an oil and gas field discovered in 1985 in the Norwegian sector of the Norwegian Sea, named after the goat Heiðrún from Norse mythology.

It has produced oil and gas since October 1995. In 2013, it produced 65,000 bbl of oil per day and 760 million cubic meters of natural gas. The crude oil is characterized as being naphthenic with 25.0 API (0.9043 g/cm3), 0.52% sulfur, and a high TAN (Total Acid Number) of 2.90.

The field has been developed with gas and water injection, using a floating concrete tension leg platform, installed over a subsea template with 58 well slots. The northern part of the field is developed with subsea facilities.

Geology
The Cimmerian structure is a southwest-plunging horst block on the southwest flank of the Nordland ridge formed in the Late Jurassic-Early Cretaceous. Production is from Jurassic Fangst Group sandstones with the Upper Jurassic Spekk Formation shales being the petroleum source and Cretaceous shales forming the seal.

References

External links 

 Heidrun Facts and Interactive map 
 Heidrun field development Information on Heidrun platform
 Heidrun Field Map & Images

Oil fields in Norway
Natural gas fields in Norway
Horsts (geology)